Mount Low (671 ft) is a mountain on East Falkland, Falkland Islands. It is due north of Stanley on the north shore of Port William.

References

Low